This is a list of notable Zainichi Koreans or notable Japanese people of Korean descent.

Politics and law
Arai Shoukei, politician, House of Representatives (Real Name: Park Kyung-jae)
Park Choon-Geum, politician, House of Representatives
Togo Shigenori, Minister of Foreign Affairs (in 1941), Minister of Greater East Asia (in 1945)
Haku Shinkun, politician, House of Councillors (Real Name: Baek Jinhoon)
Kim Ch'on-hae, leading official of the Japanese Communist Party (Originally from Ulsan, South Korea)
Lee Kyung-jae, local activist
Lee Myung-bak, President of South Korea (born in Osaka, ancestral roots in Pohang, North Gyeongsang)
Kim Pyong-sik, North Korean politician, Vice President of North Korea and chairman of the Korean Social Democratic Party (Originally from South Jeolla Province, South Korea)
Han Duk-su, North Korean politician, founder and first chairman of Chongryon
So Man-sul, North Korean politician,  Supreme People’s Assembly of North Korea, chairman of Chongryon (Originally from Gyeongju, Gyeongsangbuk-do, South Korea)
Ko Yong-hui, wife of North Korean Supreme Leader Kim Jong-il and mother of North Korea's current leader Kim Jong-un

Business and economics
Takeo Shigemitsu, founder of the Lotte group (Real Name: Shin Kyuk-ho)
Akio Shigemitsu, the son of Takeo Shigemitsu and Executive Vice President of Lotte (Real Name: Shin Dong-bin)
Hiroyuki Shigemitsu, the son of Takeo Shigemitsu and Vice President of Lotte USA (Real Name: Shin Dong-joo)
Masayoshi Son, CEO of Softbank and chairman of UK-based Arm Holdings (Real Name: Son Jeong-eui)
Taizo Son, President and Chairman of GungHo, mobile gaming company (Real Name: Taejang Son/Son Taejang/Son Tae-jang)
Masahiro Miki, founder and CEO of ABC-Mart, Japanese footwear company (Real Name: Kang Jeong-ho)
Han Chang-u, CEO of Maruhan (Japan's largest pachinko operator) - Originally from Sacheon, Gyeongsangnam-do, South Korea
Kanayama Yoshio, founder of Murasaki Sports
Yoshitaka Fukuda, President and CEO of Japanese consumer finance companies Aiful
Arai Taidō, founder of Jojoen restaurant chain
Kawamura Shinko (Madame Shinco), founder of Cowcow Food System and television personality
Okamura Katsumasa, founder and Representative Director of Reve21
Aoki Sadao, former President of MK Taxi and Resident Director of Kinkisangyo Shinkumi Bank - Originally from South Korea
Choung-Un Kim, vice president of Gilead Sciences and co-developer of tamiflu

Academia

Kang Sang-jung, political scientist, professor at the Seigakuin University and University of Tokyo
Kim Wooja, sociologist, professor at Ritsumeikan University
Woo Jang-choon, agricultural scientist and botanist
O Sonfa, professor at Takushoku University (Real Name: Oh Seon-hwa) - Originally from Jeju-do, South Korea
Suh Sung, Japanese-born Korean professor, writer and former political prisoner
Kim Ik-kyŏn, sociologist, professor at Kobe Gakuin University
Kyŏng-ju Kim, linguist, professor at Tokai University
Kanayama Rika, historian, professor at International Christian University
Yanchun Kaku, economist, President of Rikkyo University (2018-2021)
An Katsumasa, psychiatrist, professor at Kobe University
Lee Younsuk, sociolinguist, professor at Hitotsubashi University - Originally from South Korea
Yi Sookyung, historical sociologist, professor at Tokyo Gakugei University - Originally from South Korea
Jeongyun Lee, educationist, professor at University of Tokyo - Originally from South Korea
Kim Moonkyong (Kin Bunkyō), specialist of Chinese literature, professor at Tsurumi University
Yang-gi Kim, cultural historian, professor at Tokoha University
Myungsoo Kim, sociologist, professor at Kwansei Gakuin University
Kim Sook-hyun, political scientist, professor at Tokoku University and secretary for Ichirō Ozawa
Kilnam Chon, computer scientist, professor at KAIST and Keio University

Literature and poetry
Lee Hoesung, Akutagawa Prize-winning novelist
Lee Yangji, Akutagawa Prize-winning novelist
Yu Miri, Akutagawa Prize-winning novelist
Megumu Sagisawa, Izumi Kyoka Prize-winning novelist
Kim Shijon, poet and activist
Boichi, manhwa/mangaka (Real Name: Mu-jik Park)
Tachihara Masaaki, novelist (Real Name: Kim Yun Kyu) - Originally from Andong, Gyeongsangbuk-do, South Korea
Yang Sok-il, novelist

Entertainment

Film and television

 Sang-il Lee, Japan Academy Prize-winning film director
Yoichi Sai, Japan Academy Prize-winning film director (Real Name: Choe Yang-il)
Yūsaku Matsuda, actor
Ryuhei Matsuda, actor, the son of Yūsaku Matsuda
Shota Matsuda, actor, the son of Yūsaku Matsuda

 Hakuryu, actor and musician (Real Name: Jun Jung-il)

Houka Kinoshita, actor (Real Name: Rhee Bon-hwa)
Brian Tee, Japanese American actor, second-generation Zainichi Korean
Kaho Minami, actress
Yuna Ito, singer
Yuny Han, actress, singer, and pianist (Real Name: Han Tae-youn)
Juri Watanabe, model, Miss Universe Japan 2021
Koichi Iwaki, actor (Real Name: Lee Gwon-il)
Hirofumi Arai, actor, third-generation Zainichi North Korean (Real Name: Park Kyung-sik)
Hwang Jang-lee, martial artist and film actor
Tsuyoshi Ihara, actor (Real Name: Yun Yu-gu)
Kim Su-gil, film director and producer
Hyunri, actress (Real Name: Lee Hyun-ri)
Johnny Okura, actor and musician (Real Name: Park Unhwan/Park Unan)
Maruse Taro, mime artist, comedian, vaudevillian and movie star (Real Name: Kim Kyun-hong)
Kōhei Tsuka, playwright, theater director, and screenwriter (Real Name: Kim Pongung)
Mipo O,  film director, screenwriter, and commercial director
Romi Park, voice actress and singer
Yang Yong-hi, film director
Sohee Park, actor
Sunghoo Park, anime director
Gong Teyu, actor (Real Name: Gong Dae-Yoo)
Hanae Kan, actress (Real Name: Han Young-hye)
Keiko Matsuzaka, actress (Real Name: Han Kyeong-ja)
Kiko Mizuhara, actress and model (Real name: Audrie Kiko Daniel)

Music
Chon Wolson, soprano opera singer (Real Name: Jeon Wol-seon)  
Tomoyasu Hotei, also known as Hotei, Korean father and Russian-born Japanese mother
Mink, J-pop singer (Real Name: Lee Mink)
Miyavi, musician
Jyongri, singer (Real Name: Cho Jyong-ri)
Crystal Kay, singer
Hong-Jae Kim, conductor
Kim Seikyo, conductor
Ayumi Lee, as also known as Iconiq, singer, Korean father and second-generation Zainichi Korean mother
Harumi Miyako, enka singer (Real Name: Rhee Chun-mi)
Apeace, South Korean K-pop boygroup based in Japan
Park Pushim, reggae artist
Kunihiko Ryo, composer (Real Name: Yang Bang-ean)
Shion, singer (Real Name: Yu-hyang Park)
Sonim, singer, third-generation Zainichi Korean (Real Name: Seong Son-im)
Towa Tei, DJ (Real Name: Dong-hwa Chung)
Verbal, rapper of M-Flo (Real Name: Ryu Yeong-gi)
Akiko Wada, singer (Real Name: Kim Bok-ja)
Kohh, rapper
Yuna Ito, singer, Japanese father and Korean-American mother
Rihwa, pop singer (Real Name: Park Ri-hwa)
RiSe, singer, model and K-pop idol, former member of K-pop girlgroup Ladies' Code (Real Name: Kwon Ri-se)
Kangnam, singer, television personality and K-pop idol, former member of K-pop boygroup M.I.B.
Chanmina, rapper and pop musician
Yoshi (Kanemoto Yoshinori), producer, rapper and K-pop idol, member of K-pop boy group Treasure (Real Name: Kim Bang-jeon)
Giselle (Uchinaga Eri), singer, rapper, dancer and K-pop idol, member of K-pop girlgroup æspa (Real Name: Kim Ae-ri)
Saori, singer, model and entertainer (Real Name: Jang Eun-ju)
Obata Minoru, singer (Real Name: Kang Young-cheol)

Sports

Baseball
Kanemoto Tomoaki, professional baseball player, member of the Japanese Baseball Hall of Fame
Kaneda Masaichi, professional baseball player, member of the Japanese Baseball Hall of Fame (Real Name: Kim Kyung-Hong)
Harimoto Isao, professional baseball player, member of the Japanese Baseball Hall of Fame (Real Name: Jang Hun)
Hideo Fujimoto, professional baseball player, member of the Japanese Baseball Hall of Fame
Arai Takahiro, professional baseball player
Arai Ryota, professional baseball player
Morimoto Hichori, professional baseball player (Real Name: Heechul Lee)
Hisao Niura, professional baseball player (Real Name: Kim Il-young)
Hiyama Shinjiro, professional baseball player (Real Name: Hwang Jin-hwan)
Kinjoh Tatsuhiko, professional baseball player (Real Name: Kim Yong-eon)
Song Il-soo, former manager of the Doosan Bears

Martial arts
Ōyama Masutatsu, martial arts expert and founder of IKO Kyokushinkaikan, also known as Choi Bae-dal (Real Name: Choi Yeong-eui) - Originally from Gimje, Jeollabuk-do, South Korea
Matsui Akiyoshi, President of Kyokushin-kaikan (Real Name: Moon Jang-gyu)
Royama Hatsuo, President of Kyokushin-kan (Real Name: Noh Cho Woong)
Akiyama Yoshihiro, judoka and mixed martial artist (Real Name: Sung-hoon Choo)
Kotetsu Boku, kickboxer and mixed martial artist (Real Name: Park Kwang-cheol)
Hiromitsu Kanehara, mixed martial artist and professional wrestler (Real Name: Kim Wang-hong)
Hwang Jang-lee, martial artist and film actor
Kim Eui-tae, South Korean judoka and bronze medalist at 1964 Tokyo Olympics
Oh Seung-lip, South Korean judoka and silver medalist at 1972 Munich Olympics
Park Young-chul, South Korean judoka and bronze medalist at 1976 Montreal Olympics
An Chang-rim, South Korean judoka and bronze medalist at 2020 Tokyo Olympics
Kin Taiei, mixed martial artist (Real Name: Taeyoung Kim)
Hideo Nakamura, karateka and first president of the Karatedo Kendokai (Real Name: Kang Chang-Soo) - Originally from Pyongyang, North Korea

Pro-wrestling
Mitsuhiro Momota, pro-wrestler, also known as Rikidozan (Real Name: Kim Sin-rak) - Originally from Hongwon County, South Hamgyong Province, North Korea
Mitsuo Momota, pro-wrestler, son of Mitsuhiro Momota 
Yoshihiro Momota, pro-wrestler, son of Mitsuhiro Momota 
Kensho Obayashi, pro-wrestler, also known as Zeus (Real Name: Kim Bon-u), former AJPW Triple Crown Heavyweight Champion and a former four-time World Tag Team Champion
Kanemoto Koji, pro-wrestler (Real Name: Kim Il-Sung)
Kintarō Ōki, pro-wrestler (Real Name: Kim Il)
Kanemura Kouhiro, pro-wrestler (Real Name: Kim Hyeong-ho)
Kantaro Hoshino, pro-wrestler, manager, and promoter (Real Name: Yeo Geon-bu)
Maeda Akira, pro-wrestler (Real Name: Go Il-myeong)
Momota Mitsuo, pro-wrestler
Ryouji Sai, pro-wrestler (Real Name: Choi Young-ii)
Tatsuhito Takaiwa, pro-wrestler (Real Name: Go Yong-Il)
Yoshida Mitsuo, pro-wrestler, also known as Riki Choshu (Real Name: Kwak Gwang-ung)
Jake Lee, pro-wrestler (Real Name: Lee Che-Gyong)
Hiromitsu Kanehara, mixed martial artist and professional wrestler (Real Name: Kim Wang-hong)

Soccer 
Lee Tadanari, professional football player for the Japan national team (Real Name: Lee Chung-Sung)
Takahiro Kunimoto, professional football player
Okayama Kazunari, professional football player (Real Name: Kang Il-Sung)
Masahiro Okamoto, professional football player
Ahn Young-Hak, North Korean football player
Han Ho-gang, North Korean football player
Jong Tae-Se, North Korean football player
Kim Jong-Song, North Korean football player
Kim Seong-Yong, North Korean football player
Ri Han-Jae, North Korean football player
Ryang Gyu-Sa, North Korean football player
Ryang Yong-Gi, North Korean football player
Son Min-chol, North Korean football player
Kim Jung-ya, South Korean football player
Kim Yong-Gwi, South Korean football player

Sumo 

 Tamanoumi Masahiro, sumo wrestler and yokozuna
 Kaneshiro Kōfuku, sumo wrestler
 Kinkaiyama Ryū, sumo wrestler (Real Name: Kim Yeon Soo)
 Tamarikidō Hideki, sumo wrestler (Real Name: Cho Young-rae)
Tochinowaka Michihiro, sumo wrestler (Real Name: Dae Won Lee)
Kasugaō Katsumasa, sumo wrestler (Real Name: Kim Seong Taek)
Maenoyama Taro, sumo wrestler

Other
Takako Shirai, volleyball player, Olympic gold medalist at 1976 Summer Olympics, silver medalist at 1972 Summer Olympics, and member of the Volleyball Hall of Fame  (Real Name: Jeongsoon Yoon)
Hayakawa Ren, archer and bronze medalist at 2012 Summer Olympics (Real Name: Um Hye-ryeon)
Hayakawa Nami, archer at 2008 Summer Olympics (Real Name: Uhm Hye-rang/Uhm Hyerang)
Lee Ryol-li, North Korean boxer, former WBA super bantamweight champion
Kim Chae-Hwa, South Korean figure skater
Kunimoto Keisuke, race car driver, winner of 2008 Macau Grand Prix (Real Name: Lee Gyeong-Woo) 
Yuji Kunimoto, race car driver
Tokuyama Masamori, professional boxer, former WBC super flyweight champion (Real Name: Chang-Soo Hong)
Koo Ji-won, rugby player for the Japan national rugby union team
Teiru Kinoshita, professional boxer (Real Name: Park Tae-Il)
Katsunari Takahashi, professional golfer (Real Name: Go Seung-Seong)
Haru Nomura, female professional golfer (Real Name: Minkyung Moon)
Takazumi Katayama, motorcycle racer, former Grand Prix motorcycle road racing world champion

Crime 
Machii Hisayuki, godfather and founder of the Toa-kai yakuza syndicate (Real Name: Jeong Geon-Yeong)
Makino Kuniyasu, Yakuza leader of the Matsuba-kai (Real Name: Lee Chun-seong)
Takayama Tokutaro, godfather of the Aizukotetsu-kai yakuza syndicate  (Real Name: Gang Oe-su)
Kiyota Jiro, godfather of the Inagawa-kai (Real Name: Shin Byung-kyu)
Hashimoto Hirofumi, godfather of the Kyokushin-Rengo-Kai (Real Name: Kang Hong-mun)
Yanagawa Jiro, godfather of the Yanagawa-Gumi (Real Name: Yang Won Suk) - Originally from Busan, South Korea
Jo Hiroyuki, uyoku assassin  (Real Name: Seo Yuheng)
Mun Segwang, failed assassin of Park Chung-hee
Joji Obara, serial rapist and murderer (Real Name: Kim Sung Jong)
Kwon Hyi-ro, murderer who brought public attention to discrimination against the Zainichi
Sin Gwang-su, North Korean spy, involved in North Korean abductions of Japanese (Originally from North Korea)
Hayashi Yasuo, of the member in the Aum Shinrikyo. He was to carry out the Sarin gas attack on the Tokyo subway

Korean Royal Family 
Yi Geon, Korean prince, the first son of Prince Yi Kang of Korea, grandson of Emperor Gwangmu and a cavalry officer in the Imperial Japanese Army during World War II
 Yi Un,  the last crown prince of Joseon Korea.
 Prince Junda, the second son of King Muryeong of Baekje and the founding ancestor of the Yamato no Fuhito clan
 Shigakishi, the third son of King Muryeong of Baekje
 Buyeo Gonji, member of the royal family of Baekje, one of the Three Kingdoms of Korea, son of the 21st king, Gaero of Baekje and younger brother of the 22nd king, Munju of Baekje
 Dongseong of Baekje, the 24th king of Baekje, one of the Three Kingdoms of Korea and the 1st son of Buyeo Gonji
 Muryeong of Baekje, the 25th king of Baekje, one of the Three Kingdoms of Korea and the 2nd son of Buyeo Gonji
 Mokuto-Ō, prince of Baekje, one of the Three Kingdoms of Korea, the grandson of Seong of Baekje and ancestor of both Gwisil clan and Oka no muraji clan
 Prince Asa, the eldest son of King Wideok of Baekje and older brother of Prince Imseong
 Prince Imseong, the third sob of King Wideok of Baekje, younger brother of Prince Asa and ancestor of the Ōuchi clan (Originally from Baekje)
 Gwisil Boksin, military general of Baekje, one of the Three Kingdoms of Korea and member of the Gwisil clan (Originally from Baekje)
 Gwisil Jipsa, the son of Gwisil Boksin

Samurai 
Wakita Naokata, samurai from Joseon who served the Maeda clan in the early Edo period and Commissioner of Kanazawa city (Real Name: Kim Yeo-cheol) - Originally from Hanseong, Joseon (Currently Seoul, South Korea)
 Hoshiyama Chūji, founder of Satsuma ware (Real Name: Kim Hae) - Originally from Joseon
 Soga Seikan, samurai from Joseon who served Nakagawa Hidenari, the first daimyō of Oka, as a retainer (Originally from Joseon)
 Akizuki Tanenobu, renowned Korean style tofu merchant (Real Name: Park Won-hyuk) - Originally from Joseon
 Rinoie Motohiro, samurai from Joseon who served the Mōri clan and retainer of Chōshū Domain in the early Edo period and son of Korean commander and politician Yi Bok-nam (Real Name: Yi Gyeong-bu) - Originally from Hanseong, Joseon (Currently Seoul, South Korea)

References

Zainichi Koreans

Koreans